Jessica Miele is an American female mixed martial artist who competes in the Featherweight. She has formerly competed for Bellator MMA. Fight Matrix within the top #10 Women's Featherweight from January 2015 till October 2015. Sherdog had her ranked within the top 10 Female Featherweight's since January 2020, rising as high as #7.

Background

Born in Waterbury, CT she is the oldest of 3 children. Growing up Jessy played several sports such as soccer, softball and basketball. While she attended University of Massachusetts, she participated in rugby and break dancing. After college she started to look for something to keep her active and found her way to Brazilian jiu-jitsu and eventually to Mixed Martial Arts.

Outside of fighting, she is the multimedia director for Post University.

Mixed martial arts career

Early career
With a record of 8–3 on the regional scene, Miele most notably fought the likes fought Ultimate Fighter Season 18 contestant Peggy Morgan, Invicta FC title contender Charmaine Tweet, and defeated former UFC fighter Elizabeth Phillips. She also won the GC Featherweight Championship, defending the title once, and the RF Bantamweight Championship. In her two wins before the Bellator contract, she defeated touted prospect Kylie O’Hearn at CES 54 via TKO and split decision against Elizabeth Phillips at CES 56.

Bellator MMA
Miele made her Bellator debut against Talita Nogueira at Bellator 231 on October 25, 2019. She won a close bout via split decision.

Miele was expected to face Leslie Smith at Bellator 241 on March 13, 2020. However, the whole event was eventually cancelled due to the prevailing COVID-19 pandemic.

Miele faced Julia Budd on August 21, 2020, at Bellator 234. She lost the bout via unanimous decision.

Miele faced Janay Harding at Bellator 251 on November 5, 2020. She lost the bout via unanimous decision.

BTC Fight Promotions 
Miele faced Sarah Kaufman on November 20, 2021, at BTC 13: Power. She lost the bout via TKO due to ground and pound in the first round.

Championships and accomplishments

Mixed Martial Arts
Gladiator Challenge
GC Featherweight Championship
One successful title defence
Reality Fighting
RF Bantamweight Championship

Mixed martial arts record

|-
| Loss
| align=center| 9–6
| Sarah Kaufman
| TKO (punches)
| BTC 13: Power
| 
| align=center| 1
| align=center|3:56 
| St Catharines, Canada
| 
|-
| Loss
| align=center| 9–5
| Janay Harding
|  Decision (unanimous)
| Bellator 251
| 
| align=center| 3
| align=center| 5:00
| Uncasville, Connecticut, United States
| 
|-
| Loss
| align=center| 9–4
| Julia Budd
|Decision (unanimous)
|Bellator 244 
|
|align=center|3
|align=center|5:00
|Uncasville, Connecticut, United States 
|
|-
| Win
| align=center|9–3
| Talita Nogueira
|Decision (split) 
|Bellator 231
|
|align=center|3
|align=center|5:00
|Uncasville, Connecticut, United States
|
|-
| Win
| align=center| 8–3
| Elizabeth Phillips
| Decision (split)
| CES 56
| 
| align=center| 3
| align=center| 5:00
| Hartford, Connecticut, United States
| 
|-
| Win
| align=center| 7–3
| Kylie O'Hearn
|TKO (punches)
| CES 54
| 
|align=center| 3
|align=center| 4:27
| Lincoln, Rhode Island, United States
|
|-
| Win
| align=center|6–3
| Calie Cutler
|Submission (rear-naked choke)
|Reality Fighting: Mohegan Fight Night 13
|
|align=center|2
|align=center|4:38
|Uncasville, Connecticut, United States
|
|-
| Loss
| align=center|5–3
| Charmaine Tweet
|Decision (unanimous)
| Prestige FC 2
| 
| align=center|5
| align=center|5:00
| Regina, Canada
| 
|-
| Win
| align=center| 5–2
| Jamie Driver
| Submission (rear-naked choke)
|Reality Fighting: New Year's Bash 4
|
| align=center|2
| align=center|2:01
| Uncasville, Connecticut, United States
| 
|-
| Loss
| align=center| 4–2
| Peggy Morgan
|Decision (unanimous)
|CES 30
|
|align=center|3
|align=center|5:00
|Lincoln, Rhode Island, United States
| 
|-
| Win
| align=center| 4–1
| Janice Meyer
|TKO (punches)
|Reality Fighting: Mohegan Fight Night 11
|
|align=center|1
|align=center|1:51
|Uncasville, Connecticut, United States
| 
|-
| Win
| align=center| 3–1
| Lissette Neri
|Decision (split)
| Gladiator Challenge: Holiday Beatings
| 
|align=center|3
|align=center|5:00
|El Cajon, California, United States
| 
|-
| Win
| align=center| 2–1
| Lissette Neri
| Submission (rear-naked choke)
|Gladiator Challenge: Aftershock
|
| align=center| 1
| align=center| 3:25
| San Diego, California, United States
| 
|-
| Win
| align=center| 1–1
| Cassie Crisano
| Submission (armbar)
| Premier FC 17
| 
| align=center|2
| align=center|4:59
| Worcester, Massachusetts, United States
|
|-
| Loss
| align=center| 0–1
| Andria Wawro
| Submission (rear-naked choke)
| Reality Fighting: Mohegan Fight Night 10
| 
| align=center| 1
| align=center| 0:19
| Uncasville, Connecticut, United States
|

See also 
 List of female mixed martial artists

References

External links 
  
 

1985 births
Living people
American female mixed martial artists
Featherweight mixed martial artists
Mixed martial artists utilizing Brazilian jiu-jitsu
Bellator female fighters
American practitioners of Brazilian jiu-jitsu
Female Brazilian jiu-jitsu practitioners
21st-century American women